Ganula is a genus of gastropods belonging to the family Hygromiidae.

The species of this genus are found in Mediterranean.

Species:

Ganula gadirana 
Ganula lanuginosa

References

Hygromiidae